Dominic Maroh (born 4 March 1987) is a Slovenian professional football coach and a former defender. He is an assistant coach for the Under-16 squad of German club VfB Stuttgart.

Club career
Maroh began his career at TSV Neckartailfingen, played there until moving to the youth team of SSV Reutlingen in 2000. He was promoted to first team in 2006. On 21 June 2008, he moved to 1. FC Nürnberg II in the Regionalliga Süd. His first professional game was on 7 November 2008 against FSV Frankfurt. Maroh scored his first goal in the game against SpVgg Greuther Fürth, on 23 November 2008.

Maroh joined recently relegated 1. FC Köln on 8 June 2012, agreeing a two-year deal with the club.

On 28 April 2018, he played as Köln lost 3–2 to SC Freiburg which confirmed Köln’s relegation from the Bundesliga.

International career
As a son of a Slovenian father he was eligible to play for Slovenia and made public statements of his willingness to play for Slovenia. However, he later turned down the offer and decided in favour of Germany.

In 2012, he was again called to play for Slovenia by coach Slaviša Stojanovič for a friendly match against Romania. He made his debut for Slovenia on 15 August against Romania replacing Marko Šuler in the 90th minute.

References

External links

1987 births
Living people
People from Nürtingen
Sportspeople from Stuttgart (region)
Footballers from Baden-Württemberg
German people of Slovenian descent
Slovenian people of German descent
German footballers
Slovenian footballers
Slovenia international footballers
Association football defenders
Bundesliga players
2. Bundesliga players
3. Liga players
SSV Reutlingen 05 players
1. FC Nürnberg players
1. FC Nürnberg II players
1. FC Köln players
1. FC Köln II players
KFC Uerdingen 05 players